Stout Burgers and Beers is a Los Angeles-based restaurant chain.

There have been restaurants in Santa Monica, Studio City, and Louisville, Kentucky.

Philip Camino is a partner.

Reception 
Matthew Kang included the restaurant in Eater LA's 2014 list of "15 Great Places to Drink Craft Beer in LA".

References 

Companies based in Los Angeles
Culture in Santa Monica, California
Restaurants in Louisville, Kentucky
Restaurant chains in the United States
Restaurants in California
Studio City, Los Angeles